The Forty-ninth Oklahoma Legislature was a meeting of the legislative branch of the government of Oklahoma, composed of the Senate and the House of Representatives. It met in Oklahoma City from January 7, 2003 to January 4, 2005, during the first two years of the first term of Governor Brad Henry. It was marked by the passage of a ballot proposal, the Oklahoma Education Lottery Act.

Dates of sessions
Organizational day: January 7, 2003
First regular session: February 3, 2003 – May 30, 2003
Second regular session: February 2, 2004 – May 28, 2004
Special session: May 19, June 14, and June 17, 2004
Previous: 48th Legislature • Next: 50th Legislature

Party composition

Senate

House of Representatives

Major legislation

2003

Enacted
Beer - SB 353 allowed low-point beer manufactured in Oklahoma to be sold both in-state and out-of-state, designated low-point beer manufactured for exporting as tax exempt, and allowed manufacturers such as a restaurant brewery to serve customers free samples produced on the premises.
Child pornography - HB 1562 made downloading child pornography onto a computer a crime.
Insurance - SB 635 strengthened the financial oversight of HMOs by the state, combined the National Association of Insurance Commissioners’ model legislation for HMO regulation and risk-based capital with key provisions from current Oklahoma law, transferred the licensure of HMOs from the state health department to the state insurance department, delineated the authority of the state insurance commissioner and state health commissioner, and required each HMO to maintain minimum net worth of $1.5 million
Jobs - HB 1605 amended the Quality Jobs Act and Small Employer Quality Jobs Incentive Act by decreasing the percentage of inventory processed through distribution centers shipped out-of-state.
Labor - SB 741 modified the Oklahoma Employment Security Act; allowed a claimant to voluntarily terminate employment and still draw benefits if quitting to avoid domestic violence evidenced by a victim protective order; appropriated money made available by federal Reed Act and used it to make up for shortfall in the budget of the Employment Service and the Unemployment Insurance Program, One-Stop Career Centers, and to pay for reprogramming of the computer system to allow for names and Social Security numbers to be placed on the Oklahoma Employment Security Commission’s wage file.
Lawsuit reform - SB 629 created a $300,000 cap on noneconomic damages for obstetric and emergency room cases except in wrongful death cases or if negligence is shown and made other changes to regulate medical liability actions.
Lending - HB 1574 created new requirements on lending practices to deter and penalize predatory lending.
Local government - HB 1724 authorized local governments to issue bonds to finance public and private economic development projects and repay the bond through tax increases.
Military - HB 1396 created a commission to analyze state policies affecting military facilities in Oklahoma, examine methods for improving the potential private sector market value, and recommend new state policies needed to protect and expand Oklahoma’s military facilities.
Payday lending - SB 583 authorized payday lending.
Water - SB 288 placed a moratorium on the sale of water from the sole source aquifer to cities and towns until a study is done by the Oklahoma Water Resources Board.
Water - SB 408 directed the Secretary of Environment to conduct a comprehensive study of the watershed of the Grand Lake area to identify factors that may impact the economic growth and environmental uses of the lake. Several state environmental agencies are also directed to participate in the study.

Failed
Livestock care - SB 557 would have required veterinarians to report to the state agriculture board within 24 hours animals suspected of having a disease that could cause of a public health emergency, but was vetoed by the governor.

Ballot proposals
Oklahoma Education Lottery Act - HB 1278 established State Question 705 to be submitted to the voters for their approval regarding the establishment of a statewide lottery to benefit schools and a governing board.

2004

Enacted
State employees - HB 2005 set out a total of $2,100 in across-the-board salary increases over the next two fiscal years for state employees, public school teachers and state troopers.
Meth - HB 2176 limited the sale of pseudoephedrine products used to make crystal meth.
Economic development - HB 2288 created the Rural Action Partnership Program and established resources for starting businesses in rural areas.
Volunteer Firefighter Training Incentive Act of 2004 - HB 2372 established the Oklahoma Council on Firefighter Training and an income tax credit for volunteer firefighters who achieve specified firefighter training or certification.
Oil and gas - HB 2550 designed to quickly resolve disputes between the two segments of the oil and gas industry by enhancing state oversight of gas gathering and increasing the authority of the Oklahoma Corporation Commission to examine charges of abuse in order to ensure gas gatherers are charged fair and reasonable prices.
Municipal Employee Collective Bargaining Act - SB 1529 affected municipalities with a population of greater than 35,000 persons and special authorities, agencies, and boards created by municipalities; allows non-uniform municipal employees to form employee organizations in order to collectively bargain and negotiate for employment-related benefits.
Finance - SB 1565 followed up payday loan bill in 2003 with protections for borrowers.

Leadership

Senate

Democratic
 President Pro Tempore of the Oklahoma Senate Cal Hobson
 Majority Floor Leader Ted Fisher
 Appropriations Chair Mike Morgan
 Caucus Chair Maxine Cissel-Horner

Republican
 Minority leader James Allen Williamson
 Republican Caucus Chair Mike Johnson

House of Representatives

Democratic
 Speaker Larry Adair
 Speaker Pro Tempore Danny Hilliard
 Majority Floor Leader Larry Rice
 Appropriations and Budget Chair Bill Mitchell
 Caucus Chair David Braddock
 Caucus Secretary Roy McClain

Republican
 Minority leader Todd Hiett
 Caucus Chair Mark Liotta
 Caucus Secretary Ron Peterson

Members

Senate

House of Representatives

See also
Oklahoma state elections, 2002

References

Oklahoma legislative sessions
2003 in Oklahoma
2004 in Oklahoma
2003 U.S. legislative sessions
2004 U.S. legislative sessions